Agdistis pustulalis is a moth in the family Pterophoridae. It is known from South Africa, Lesotho, Namibia, Mozambique, Zimbabwe, Zambia and Malawi.

References

Agdistinae
Moths of Africa
Moths described in 1864